In set theory, a normal measure is a measure on a measurable cardinal κ such that the equivalence class of the identity function on κ maps to κ itself in the ultrapower construction. Equivalently, if f:κ→κ is such that f(α)<α for most α<κ, then there is a β<κ such that f(α)=β for most α<κ. (Here, "most" means that the set of elements of κ where the property holds is a member of the ultrafilter, i.e. has measure 1.) Also equivalent, the ultrafilter (set of sets of measure 1) is closed under diagonal intersection.

For a normal measure, any closed unbounded (club) subset of κ contains most ordinals less than κ. And any subset containing most ordinals less than κ is stationary in κ.

If an uncountable cardinal κ has a measure on it, then it has a normal measure on it.

See also 
 Measurable cardinal
 Club set

References 
  pp 52–53

Large cardinals
Measures (set theory)